Richard Hare may refer to:

 R. M. Hare (1919–2002), English moral philosopher
 Richard Hare (bishop) (1922–2010), suffragan bishop of Pontefract
 Richard Hare, 4th Earl of Listowel (1866–1931), Irish peer and British Army officer